The Embassy of Mexico in China, based out of Beijing, is the primary diplomatic mission from the United Mexican States to the People's Republic of China.

Location 
The chancery for the Embassy is located at Sanlitun Dong Wu Jie 5, Chaoyang in Beijing. Additionally, Mexico maintains a cultural section in order to promote the culture, artistic community and image of Mexico in China.

Mexico also maintains consulates-general in Guangzhou, Hong Kong and Shanghai.

History 
Mexico and the Qing dynasty first began official diplomatic relations on 14 December 1899 following the signing of the Treaty of Friendship, Commerce and Navigation. Later, Mexico opened its first legation in Beijing in 1904.

Following the Chinese Revolution of 1911, the legation was instructed to continue representing the interests of Mexico before the new government. However, due to the instability resulting from the Second Sino-Japanese War and the Chinese Civil War, Mexico was forced to relocated its legation multiple times. First, to Nanjing, the capital of the Republic of China, then to Shanghai. Following Japan's invasion in 1941, Mexico was forced to close its legation in Shanghai.

In 1942, Mexico reopened its legation in the city of Chongqing, the provisional home of the Republic of China, and in 1943 diplomatic missions between the two nations were elevated to that of embassies. In 1945 General Heliodoro Escalante presented his credentials to President Chiang Kai-shek as Mexico's first ambassador to China. From 1949 to 1971 Mexico maintained relations with the Republic of China, even after its defeat in the Chinese Civil War. However, Mexico did not formally establish an embassy in the Republic of China, instead allowing its ambassador in Japan to act concurrently in China.

In November 1971, following the passage of United Nations General Assembly Resolution 2758, Mexico decided to break off relations with the Republic of China as the People's Republic of China was recognized as the only legitimate representative of China to the United Nations. Subsequently, on 14 February 1972 Mexico and the People's Republic of China formally established diplomatic relations. As part of this agreement, both countries agreed to the installation of diplomatic representations at the ambassador level in their respective capitals. Mexico opened its first embassy in Beijing in May 1972, with its first ambassador, Eugenio Anguiano Roch, presenting his credentials to the Chinese government on 9 August 1972. Since the establishment of relations between the two countries, every Mexican president has paid China an official state visit, beginning with Luis Echeverría in 1973.

Ambassadors 
The following is the list of Mexican Ambassadors to China since 1972, the year Mexico recognized the People's Republic of China as the sole representative of the Chinese people:

See also 
 China–Mexico relations
 Foreign relations of Mexico
 List of diplomatic missions of Mexico

References

External links 
 Official website (in Spanish)
 Secretariat of Foreign Affairs (in Spanish)

1904 establishments in China